Emin Cemal Suda (1877 – 23 November 1940) was a Turkish far-right politician. He was elected to the parliament as a deputy from Bolu.

References

1877 births
1940 deaths
Place of death missing
Republican People's Party (Turkey) politicians
Deputies of Bolu